The Old Rectory is a privately owned historic house located in West Sussex in the village of Chidham.

The rectory was Grade II listed in 1986.

References 

Grade II listed buildings in West Sussex
Chichester District